This is a list of museums in Antigua and Barbuda.

 Museum of Antigua & Barbuda
 Dockyard Museum
 Betty's Hope Museum

See also 
 List of museums by country

Antigua and Barbuda
 
Museums
Antigua and Barbuda

Museums
Museums